Sikyona is a municipality in Corinthia, Greece. The seat of the municipality is in Kiato. Sikyona takes its name from the ancient city Sicyon, which was located in the same territory.

Municipality
The municipality Sikyona was formed at the 2011 local government reform by the merger of the following 3 former municipalities, that became municipal units:
Feneos
Sikyona
Stymfalia

The municipality has an area of 602.539 km2, the municipal unit 171.268 km2. The municipal unit Sikyona is subdivided into the following communities:
 Archaia Sikyona-Vasiliko
 Bozikas
 Diminio
 Gonoussa
 Kato Diminio
 Sikyona (Kiato)
 Klimenti
 Kryoneri
 Laliotis
 Megas Valtos
 Mikros Valtos
 Moulki
 Paradeisi
 Pasi
 Souli
 Titani

Historical population

References

External links

 
Municipalities of Peloponnese (region)
Populated places in Corinthia